I'm Your Boy is the third Japanese studio album by South Korean boy band Shinee, released on September 24, 2014, in Japan by Universal Music Japan sublabel EMI Records. The album features three previously released singles, "Boys Meet U", "3 2 1" and "Lucky Star". It sold 45,000 copies during the first week of its release, marking the first time Shinee had reached the number one spot on the weekly chart since their Japanese debut in June 2011.

Background and release
The album was released in three versions. A limited edition A containing a DVD, a 48-page photo booklet, and a photocard. The DVD includes the MV of "Boys Meet U", "3 2 1" and "Lucky Star" plus the Boys Meet U Special Showcase Live Movie. The limited edition B contains a DVD, a 48-page photo book, and a photocard. The DVD includes the MV of "Boys Meet U", "3 2 1" and "Lucky Star", plus the jacket shooting sketch and special interview about I'm Your Boy. The regular edition contains a 28-page photo book and a photocard.

Singles
Three singles were spawned from the album, including "Boys Meet U" on August 21, 2013, which was certified gold in physical shipments of over 100,000 copies by the Recording Industry Association of Japan (RIAJ). "3 2 1" was made available on December 4, 2013. 

"Lucky Star" was released as the third single on June 25, 2014, by Universal Music Japan sublabel EMI Records. This single was distributed in two versions—the limited edition came with a bonus DVD containing the music video, a sketch of the music video's making, a photo card (1 out of 6 random cards) and a 28-page photo booklet. The regular edition came with a 12-page photo booklet. The music video teaser for "Lucky Star" was released through the label's YouTube channel on May 19, 2014, and the short version of the music video was released on May 30.

Promotion
Shinee performed "Downtown Baby" for the first time at Tokyo Girls Collection held at Saitama Super Arena on September 6, 2014. They also performed their debut song, "Replay (Kimi wa Boku no Everything)" and "Everybody". On September 24, 2014, Shinee held a showcase at Shinjuku Tower Records in front of over 2,500 fans to promote their upcoming album.

The group's Shinee World 2014 included songs from their third Japanese album, I'm Your Boy. They held a 30 show concert tour in 19 locations around Japan. The tour was divided in two according to the venue: a hall tour and an arena tour; from September 28, 2014, to December 14, 2014.

Track list
Credits adapted from the official homepage.

Charts

Weekly charts

Monthly charts

References

Shinee albums
SM Entertainment albums
EMI Records albums
Universal Music Japan albums
2014 albums
Japanese-language albums